Jørgen Langhelle (18 August 1965 – 3 August 2021) was a Norwegian actor of stage, screen and television.

Biography 
Langhelle starred in the two successful Norwegian mini-series Deadline Torp (2005) and Torpedo (2007), as well as in movies such as Kristin Lavransdatter (1995), Elling (2001), I Am Dina (2002), Tyven, tyven (2002), Ulvesommer (2003) and En folkefiende (a modernized version of Henrik Ibsen's play An Enemy of the People) (2005). In March 2010, Langhelle was cast in The Thing, the 2011 prequel to John Carpenter's 1982 horror classic of the same title.

Partial filmography

 Kristin Lavransdatter (1995) - Simon Darre
 The Other Side of Sunday (1996) - Young Priest
 Hustruer III (1996) - Hugo
 Hamsun (1996) - Dommer Eide
 Salige er de som tørster (1997) - Olaf Frydenberg
 Only Clouds Move the Stars (1998) - Father
 Cellofan – med døden til følge (1998) - Jon 'Tiger' Eilertsen
 Elling (2001) - Frank Åsli
 Tyven, tyven (2002) - Harald Gran
 I Am Dina (2002) - Anders
 Pelle politibil (2002) - Langeleif
 Ulvesommer (2003) - Jon Reitan
 Tur & retur (2003) - Torkel
 Uno (2004) - Police officer
 Min misunnelige frisør (2004) - Finn
 Deadline Torp (2004, TV Movie) - Åge Lamberg
 En folkefiende (2005) - Tomas Stockman
 Harrys döttrar (2005) - Erik
 Arn: The Knight Templar (2007) - Erik Jedvardsson
 Kautokeino-opprøret (2008) - Halmboe
 The Man Who Loved Yngve (2008) - Terje Orheim - Jarles far
 Ulvenatten (2008) - Bjørnar Lehmann
 The Whore (2009) - Politiet
 Betrayal (2009) - Moland
 Yohan: The Child Wanderer (2010) - Nome
 The Thing (2011) - Lars
 Varg Veum - De døde har det godt (2012) - William Moberg
 Inside the Whore (2012) - Medietilsynet
 Pioneer (2013) - Leif
 The Veil of Twilight (2014) - Sysselmannen
 Dirk Ohm - Illusjonisten som forsvant (2015) - Marias far
 Armoton maa (2017) - Gunnar
 Kings Bay (2017) - Knut
 Oskars Amerika (2017) - Levi
 Valley of Shadows (2017) - Policeman
 Juleblod (2017) - Nissen
 Kometen (2017) - Bill
 The Birdcatcher (2019) - Henry Gleditsch
 Fågelfångarens Son (2019) - Såmal

References

External links 
 

1965 births
2021 deaths
Norwegian male film actors
People from Sandnes